Pontsarn Halt railway station served the village of Vaynor and the area of Pontsarn, Glamorgan, Wales, 1869 to 1961 on the Brecon and Merthyr Tydfil Junction Railway.

History 
The station opened as Pontsarn in June 1869 by the Brecon and Merthyr Tydfil Junction Railway. Its name changed to Pontsarn for Vaynor in 1884, which was changed to Pontsarn Halt on 1 March 1931. The suffix 'Halt' was dropped by the GWR timetables in 1935 and dropped completely in 1940. The suffix was added back in 1953. The station closed on 13 November 1961.

References

External links 

Former Brecon and Merthyr Tydfil Junction Railway stations
Former London and North Western Railway stations
Railway stations in Great Britain opened in 1867
Railway stations in Great Britain closed in 1961
1869 establishments in Wales
1961 disestablishments in Wales